Hook is a village and civil parish in the East Riding of Yorkshire, England.

According to the 2011 UK census, Hook parish had a population of 1,292, an increase on the 2001 UK census figure of 1,141.

The parish was part of the Goole Rural District in the West Riding of Yorkshire from 1894 to 1974, then in Boothferry district of Humberside until 1996.

The church dedicated to St Mary the Virgin was designated a Grade II* listed building in 1967 and is now recorded in the National Heritage List for England, maintained by Historic England.

The village has a nearby local school: Hook Church Of England Primary School. There is also a small local post office and two public houses. The village a number of building sites for the purpose of housing development.

Nearby Goole has facilities including Tesco, Morrisons and Asda supermarkets, several chain-shops, schools, a hospital, and a railway station with services to Hull, Doncaster and Leeds.

References

Villages in the East Riding of Yorkshire
Civil parishes in the East Riding of Yorkshire